Tizita Bogale Ashame (born July 13, 1993) is an Ethiopian runner who specializes in the middle distance events.

Achievements

References

External links

1993 births
Living people
Ethiopian female middle-distance runners
Youth Olympic gold medalists for Ethiopia
Athletes (track and field) at the 2010 Summer Youth Olympics
Youth Olympic gold medalists in athletics (track and field)
21st-century Ethiopian women